Germany and the United Kingdom have had diplomatic relations since German unification in 1871. Prior to that, the only German states holding diplomatic relations with the U.K. were the Kingdom of Prussia, since 1835, and the three Hanseatic cities of Bremen, Hamburg and Lübeck, since 1853.

Envoys of the German states

Saxony
1701–1703 Balthasar Heinrich von Nischwitz
1714–1718 Georg Sigismund Nostitz
Karl Georg Friedrich von Flemming (1705–1767)

Hanover
 1702 Ernst August von Platen-Hallermund

Holstein-Gottorp
 1713–1714 Gerhard Nath (1666–1740)
 1714–1719 Hermann von Petkum

Electorate of the Palatinate
 1715–1716 Franz Ludwig Viktor Effern

Trier
 1715 Hermann Beveren

BavariaTobias C. Bringmann: Handbuch der Diplomatie, 1815–1963: Auswärtige Missionschefs in Deutschland und Deutsche Missionschefs im Ausland von Metternich bis Adenauer. Walter de Gruyter, Berlin 2001, S. 40. 

1692: Opening of diplomatic mission

17??–1739: Johann Franz von Haslang
1739–1783: Joseph Franz Xaver von Haslang (ca. 1700–1783)
1783–1803: Siegmund von Haslang (1740–1803)
1800–1801: Franz Gabriel von Bray (1765–1832)

1804–1814: Interruption of diplomatic relations, due to alliance with France during Napoleonic Wars

1814–1822: Christian Hubert Pfeffel von Kriegelstein (1765–1834)
1822–1833: August Baron de Cetto (1794–1879)
1833–1835: Franz Oliver von Jenison-Walworth (1787–1867)
1835–1867: August Baron de Cetto (1794–1879)
1868–1871: Ferdinand von Hompesch-Bollheim (1824–1913)

1871: Closure of legation

Brandenburg-Prussia 
1604 Hans von Bodeck (1582–1658)
1651–1655:
1655–16??: Johann Friedrich Schlezer (1610–1673)

1671–1675: Lorenz Georg von Krockow (1638–1702)
1675–1678: Otto von Schwerin (1645–1705)
1678–1682:
1682–1685: Pierre de Falaiseau (1649–1726)
1685–1686: Johann von Besser (1654–1729)
16??–16??: Wolfgang von Schmettau (1648–1711)
16??–1688: Samuel von Schmettau (1657–1709)
1688–1697:  Thomas Ernst von Danckelmann (1638–1709)
1697–1698: Friedrich Bogislaw Dobrženský von Dobrženitz (k.A.)
1698–1699: Christoph I. zu Dohna-Schlodien (1665–1733)
1700–1700: David Ancillon the Younger (1670–1723)

Envoys Extraordinary of Prussia

1707–1710: Ezechiel von Spanheim (1629–1710)
1711–1712: Johann August Marschall von Bieberstein (1672–1736)
1712–1719: Ludwig-Friedrich Bonnet de Saint-Germain (1670–1761)
1719–1726: Johann Christoph Julius Ernst von Wallenrodt (1670–1727)
1726–1730: Benjamin Friedrich von Reichenbach (1697–1750)
1730–1733: Christoph Martin von Degenfeld-Schonburg (1689–1762)
1733–1737: Caspar Wilhelm von Borcke (1704–1747)
1737–1742: 
1742–1744: Count Karl-Wilhelm Finck von Finckenstein (1714–1800)
1744–1748:
1748–1750: Joachim Wilhelm von Klinggräff (1692–1757)
1750–1758: Abraham Louis Michell, Geschäftsträger (1712–1782)
1758–1760: Dodo Heinrich zu Innhausen und Knyphausen (1729–1789)
1760–1764: Abraham Louis Michell (1712–1782)
1764-1766: 
1766–1780: Joachim Carl von Maltzan (1733–1817)
1780–1788: Spiridion von Lusi (1741–1815)
1788–1790: Philipp Karl von Alvensleben (1745–1802)
1790–1792: Sigismund Ehrenreich Johann von Redern (1761–1841)
1792–1807: Constans Philipp Wilhelm von Jacobi-Klöst (1745–1817)
1807–1815:
1815–1817: Constans Philipp Wilhelm von Jacobi-Klöst (1745–1817)
1817–1818: Wilhelm von Humboldt (1767–1835)
1818–1821: vacant
1821–1824: Heinrich von Werther (1772–1859)
1824–1827: Bogislaw von Maltzan (1793–1833)
1827–1841: Heinrich von Bülow (1791–1845)
1841–1854: Christian Charles Josias Bunsen (1791–1860)
1854–1861: Albrecht von Bernstorff (1809–1873)
1861–1862: vacant
1862–1873: Albrecht von Bernstorff (1809–1873)

Ambassadors of Germany

North German Confederation (1867–1871)
Albrecht von Bernstorff

German Reich (1871–1945)

German Empire (1871–1918) 
Albrecht von Bernstorff (1871–1873)
Georg Herbert zu Münster (1873–1885)
Paul von Hatzfeldt (1885–1901)
Paul Wolff Metternich (1901–1912)
Adolf Marschall von Bieberstein (1912)
Karl Max, Prince Lichnowsky (1912–1914)
diplomatic relations disrupted due to World War I

Weimar Republic (1919–1933) 

Friedrich Sthamer (1920–1930) (chargé d'affaires from 1919)
Konstantin von Neurath (1930–1932)
Leopold von Hoesch (1932–1933)

Nazi Germany (1933–1945) 
Leopold von Hoesch (1933–1936)
Joachim von Ribbentrop (1936–1938)
Herbert von Dirksen (1938–1939)
diplomatic relations disrupted due to World War II

German Democratic Republic (1949–1990)
Karl Heinz Kern (1971–1980)
Martin Bierbach (1980–1984)
Gerhard Lindner (1984–1989)
Joachim Mitdank (1989–1990)
Ulrike Birkner (1990; until 2 October)

Federal Republic of Germany (since 1949)

Hans Schlange-Schöningen (1950–1955)
Hans Heinrich Herwarth von Bittenfeld (1955–1961)
Hasso von Etzdorf (1961–1965)
Herbert Blankenhorn (1965–1970)
Karl-Günther von Hase (1970–1977)
Hans Helmut Ruethe (1977–1980)
Jürgen Ruhfus (1980–1983)
Rüdiger von Wechmar (1985–1989)
Hermann von Richthofen (1989–1993)
Peter Hartmann (1993–1995)
Jürgen Oesterhelt (1995–1997)
Gebhardt von Moltke (1997–1999)
Hans-Friedrich von Ploetz (1999–2002)
Thomas Matussek (2002–2006)
Wolfgang Ischinger (2006–2008)
Georg Boomgaarden (2008–2014)
Peter Ammon (2014–2018)
Peter Wittig (2018–2020)
Andreas Michaelis (2020–2022)
 (since 2022)

See also
 Embassy of Germany, London
 List of diplomats of the United Kingdom to Germany

References

External links

 
United Kingdom
Germany